"One"  is a song by Swedish singer Måns Zelmerlöw. The song was released as a digital download on 21 November 2019 through Warner Music Group as the third single from his eighth studio album Time. The song was written by Jon Eyden, Matthew Holmes, Phillip Leigh and Måns Zelmerlöw. The song did not enter the Swedish Singles Chart, but peaked at number 20 on the Sweden Heatseeker Songs Chart.

Music video
A music video to accompany the release of "One" was first released onto YouTube on 21 November 2019. The music video was directed by Robin Ehlde. The video was shot was shot in one take.

Personnel
Credits adapted from Tidal.
 Mac & Phil – producer
 Jeremy Wheatley for 365 Artists – mixer
 Jon Eyden – writer
 Matthew Holmes – writer
 Måns Zelmerlöw – writer
 Phillip Leigh – writer

Charts

Release history

References

2019 songs
2019 singles
Måns Zelmerlöw songs
Songs written by Måns Zelmerlöw